This is a partial list of Brazilian sportspeople.

Athletics
Joaquim Cruz (born 1963)
José da Conceição (born 1931)
Adhemar da Silva (born 1927)
Arnaldo da Silva (born 1964)
Claudinei da Silva (born 1970)
Robson da Silva (born 1964)
Vanderlei Cordeiro de Lima (born 1969)
Vicente de Lima (born 1977)
João Carlos de Oliveira (born 1954)
André da Silva (born 1972)
Maurren Maggi (born 1976)
Nelson Prudêncio (born 1924)
Édson Ribeiro (born 1972)
Cláudio Roberto Souza (born 1970)

Basketball
 Anderson Varejão (born 1982), NBA player (Cleveland Cavaliers)
 Hortência, (born 1959)
 Leandrinho (born 1982), NBA player (Phoenix Suns)
 Nenê, (born 1982), NBA player (Denver Nuggets)
 Oscar Schmidt, (born 1958)
 Paula, (born 1962)

Bobsled
 Eric Maleson (born 1967), 2002 Olympic Athlete - pilot

Boxing
 Eder Jofre - world champion
 Maguila - heavyweight
 Acelino Freitas (Popó), (born 1975), world champion

Football
 Ademir da Guia (born 1942)
 Adriano (born 1982)
 Advaldo (born 1986)
 Albadilon da Silva Carvalho (born 1984)
 Aldair (born 1965)
 Arthur Friedenreich (1892–1969)
 Bebeto (born 1964)
 Cafu (born 1970)
 Camilo de Souza Vieira (born 1986)
 Careca (born 1960)
 Carlos Alberto (born 1944)
 Carlos Alberto Parreira (born 1943)
 Clodoaldo (born 1949)
 Cristiane (born 1985)
 Diego
 Djalma Dias (1939–1990)
 Djalma Santos (born 1929)
 Garrincha (born 1933)
 Gérson (born 1941)
 Gilmar (born 1930)
 Jairzinho (born 1944)
 João Saldanha (1917–1990)
 Júnior (born 1954)
 Juninho Pernambucano (born 1975)
 Kaká (born 1982)
 Leônidas da Silva (1913–2004)
 Luís Fabiano (born 1980)
 Luis Pereira (born 1949)
 Luiz Felipe Scolari (born 1948)
 Marcos (born 1973)
 Marta (born 1986)
 Mazola (born 1938)
 Nílton Santos (born 1927)
 Pelé (born 1940)
 Raí (born 1965)
 Robinho (born 1984)
 Renê Carmo Kreutz Weber, (born 1960), former player, trainer (in Brazil and in other countries)
 Rivaldo (born 1972)
 Rivellino (born 1946)
 Roberto Carlos (born 1973)
 Rogério Ceni (born 1973)
 Romário (born 1966)
 Ronaldinho (born 1980)
 Ronaldo (born 1976)
 Sócrates (1954–2011)
 Toninho Cerezo (born 1955)
 Tostão (born 1947)
 Vavá (1934–2002)
 Zico (born 1953)

Golf
 Angela Park (born 1988)

Judo
 Aurélio Miguel (born 1964)
 Carlos Honorato (born 1974)
 Denílson Lourenço (born 1977)
 Edinanci Silva (born 1976)
 Flávio Canto (born 1975)
 João Derly (born 1981)
 Ketleyn Quadros (born 1987)
 Leandro Guilheiro (born 1983)
 Luciano Corrêa (born 1982)
 Rogério Sampaio (born 1967)
 Tiago Camilo (born 1982)

Martial arts/Mixed martial arts

 Allan Goes
 Anderson Silva
 Antônio Rodrigo Nogueira
 Antônio Rogério Nogueira
 Carlos Gracie Jr.
 Carlson Gracie
 Demian Maia
 Eduardo de Lima
 Fabrício Werdum
 Gabriel Gonzaga
 Hélio Gracie
 Hermes Franca
 Jorge Gurgel
 Lyoto Machida
 Marco Ruas
 Mario Sperry
 Mauricio "Shogun" Rua
 Murilo Bustamante
 Murilo "Ninja" Rua
 Paulo Filho
 Pedro Rizzo
 Renato "Babalu" Sobral
 Ricardo Arona
 Rickson Gracie
 Royce Gracie
 Thiago Silva
 Vitor Belfort
 Vítor Ribeiro
 Wallid Ismail
 Wanderlei Silva
 Wilson Gouveia
 Marcio Navarro

Racing
 Alex Ribeiro (born 1948), Formula One driver
 Andre Ribeiro (born 1966), Champ Car driver
 Ayrton Senna (1960–1994), Formula One driver
 Bruno Senna (born 1983), Formula One and Le Mans Series driver
 Bruno Junqueira (born 1976), Champ Car driver
 Carlos Pace (1944–1977), Formula One driver
 Christian Fittipaldi (born 1971), Formula One and Champ Car driver
 Cristiano da Matta (born 1973), Formula One and Champ Car driver
 Emerson Fittipaldi (born 1946), Formula One and Champ Car driver
 Enrique Bernoldi (born 1978), Formula One, Indy Racing League and Superleague Formula
 Felipe Massa (born 1981), Formula One driver
 Fernando Rees (born 1985), Le Mans Series driver
 Gil de Ferran (born 1967), Indy Car and Champ Car driver
 Hélio Castroneves (born 1975), Indy Racing League driver
 Maurício Gugelmin (born 1963), Formula One and Champ Car driver
 Nelson Piquet (born 1952), Formula One driver
 Nelson Piquet Jr. (born 1985), Formula One driver
 Pedro Diniz (born 1970), Formula One driver
 Raul Boesel (born 1957), Formula One, Indy Car and Champ Car driver
 Roberto Moreno (born 1948), Formula One, Indy Car and Champ Car driver
 Ricardo Rosset (born 1968), Formula One driver
 Ricardo Zonta (born 1976), Formula One, FIA GT Championship and Rolex Sports Car Series driver
 Rubens Barrichello (born 1972), Formula One driver
 Tony Kanaan (born 1974), Indy Car and Champ Car driver
 Tarso Marques (born 1976), TC2000 and Stock Car Brasil
 Vítor Meira (born 1977), Indy Car driver
 Wilson Fittipaldi (born 1943), Formula One driver
 Lucas di Grassi (born 1984), Formula One and Formula E driver

Rodeo
 Adriano Moraes (born 1970), three-time PBR world champion
 Guilherme Marchi (born 1982), bull rider on the PBR circuit

Skateboarding
 Bob Burnquist (born 1976), skateboarder
 Fabiola da Silva (born 1979), aggressive inline skater]
 Sandro Dias (born 1975)

Swimming

 César Cielo (born 1987)
 Flávia Delaroli (born 1983)
 Fabíola Molina (born 1985)
 Gabriel Mangabeira (born 1982)
 Gustavo Borges (born 1972)
 Kaio Márcio (born 1984)
 Lucas Salatta (born 1987)
 Maria Lenk (1915–2007)
 Poliana Okimoto (born 1983)
 Thiago Pereira (born 1986)
 Xuxa (born 1974)

Taekwondo
 Diogo Silva (born 1982)
 Natália Falavigna (born 1984)

Tennis
 André Sá (born 1977)
 Fernando Meligeni (born 1971)
 Flávio Saretta (born 1980)
 Gustavo Kuerten, (born 1976)(number one of the world in 2001
 Jaime Oncins (born 1970)
 Luiz Mattar (born 1963)
 Marcelo Melo (born 1983)
 Marcos Daniel (born 1978)
 Maria Ester Bueno (born 1939)
 Ricardo Acioly (born 1964)
 Thomaz Bellucci (born 1987)

Volleyball
 Amauri (born 1959)
 Anderson (born 1974)
 André Heller (born 1975)
 André Nascimento (born 1979)
 Bebeto de Freitas (born 1950)
 Bernard (born 1957)
 Bernardinho (born 1959)
 Carlão (born 1965)
 Dante (born 1980)
 Fofão (born 1970)
 Giba (born 1976)
 Giovane (born 1970)
 Gustavo (born 1975)
 Jaque (born 1983)
 Marcelo Negrão (born 1972)
 Maurício Lima (born 1968)
 Montanaro (born 1958)
 Moreno (born 1949)
 Murilo (born 1981)
 Nalbert (born 1974)
 Paula Pequeno (born 1982)
 Renan (born 1960)
 Ricardinho (born 1975)
 Serginho (born 1975)
 Sheilla (born 1983)
 Tande (born 1970)
 Virna (born 1971)
 William (born 1954)

Brazil
Lists